The international dollar (int'l dollar or intl dollar, symbols Int'l$., Intl$., Int$), also known as Geary–Khamis dollar (symbols G-K$ or GK$), is a hypothetical unit of currency that has the same purchasing power parity that the U.S. dollar had in the United States at a given point in time. It is mainly used in economics and financial statistics for various purposes, most notably to determine and compare the purchasing power parity and gross domestic product of various countries and markets. The year 1990 or 2000 is often used as a benchmark year for comparisons that run through time. The unit is often abbreviated, e.g. 2000 US dollars or 2000 International$ (if the benchmark year is 2000).

It is based on the twin concepts of purchasing power parities (PPP) of currencies and the international average prices of commodities. It shows how much a local currency unit is worth within the country's borders. It is used to make comparisons both between countries and over time. For example, comparing per capita gross domestic product (GDP) of various countries in international dollars, rather than based simply on exchange rates, provides a more valid measure to compare standards of living. It was proposed by Roy C. Geary in 1958 and developed by Salem Hanna Khamis between 1970 and 1982.

Figures expressed in international dollars cannot be converted to another country's currency using current market exchange rates; instead they must be converted using the country's PPP exchange rate used in the study.

Exchange rate by country 
According to IMF, below is the implied PPP rate of International dollar to local currency of respective countries in 2022:

Short description of Geary-Khamis system 
This system is valuing the matrix of quantities using the international prices vector. The vector is obtained by averaging the national prices in the participating countries after their conversion into a common currency with PPP and weighing quantities. PPPs are obtained by averaging the shares of national and international prices in the participating countries weighted by expenditure. International prices and PPPs are defined by a system of interrelated linear equations that need to be solved simultaneously. The GK method produces PPPs that are transitive and actual final expenditures that are additive.

Inflation adjusting 
When comparing between countries and between years, the international dollar figures may be adjusted to compensate for inflation. In that case, the base year is chosen, and all figures will be expressed in constant international dollars for that specified base year. Researchers must understand which adjustments are reflected in the data (Marty Schmidt):

 Population adjustments (In which case, figures represent per capita monies)
 Currency exchange rate adjustments (In which case, figures will be expressed in one currency unit (typically , International $, € £ or ¥)
 Purchasing power parity adjustments and/or average commodity prices (in which case, figures are typically expressed as International $)
 Inflation adjustments (in which case, figures have been adjusted, based on changes in an inflation index such as the consumer price index, to represent currency for a "base" year, such as 2000).

Description of Geary-Khamis system 
Suppose PPPj is the parity of j-th currency with a currency called international dollars, which may reflect any currency, however, US dollar is the most commonly used. Then the international price Pi is defined as an international average of prices of i-th commodity in various countries. Prices in these countries are expressed in their national currencies. Geary-Khamis method solves this by using national prices after conversion into a common currency using the purchasing power parities (PPP). Hence, the international price, Pi of i-th commodity is defined as:

 

This equation implies that the international price of i-th commodity is calculated by dividing the total output of i-th commodity in all selected countries, converted in international dollars, using purchasing power parities, by the total quantity produced of i-th commodity. Previous equation can be rewritten as follows:

 

This equation suggests that Pi is weighted average of international prices pij after conversion into international dollars using PPPj. PPPj is by Geary-Khamis system defined through this equation:

 

The numerator of the equation represents the total value of output in j-th country expressed in national currency, and the denominator is the value of j-th country output evaluated by repricing at international prices Pi in international dollars. Then PPPj gives the number of national currency units per international dollar.

Advantages of Geary-Khamis method 
Geary-Khamis international dollar is widely used by foreign investors and institutions such as IMF, FAO and World Bank. It has become so widely used because it made possible to compare living standards between countries. Thanks to the international dollar they can see more trustworthy economic situation in the country and decide whether to provide additional loans (or any other investments) to said country, or not. It also offers some comparison of purchasing power parities all around the world (developing countries tend to have higher PPPs). Some traders even use Geary-Khamis method to determine if country's currency is undervalued or overvalued. Exchange rates are frequently used for comparing currencies, however, this approach does not reflect real value of currency in said country. It is better to include PPP or prices of goods in said country. International dollar solves this by taking into account exchange rates, PPP and average commodity prices. Geary-Khamis method is the best method for comparisons of agricultural outputs.

Criticism of using 1990 US dollars for long run comparisons 

Economists and historians use many methods when they want to research economic development in the past. For example, if we take the United States of America and United Kingdom (these two examples were compared many times in various researches), someone may use nominal exchange rates, Lindert and Williamson (2016) used PPP exchange rates and Broadberry (2003) used growth rates using own-country price indices. However, none of them is somehow better than the others (or theoretically justifiable). There is a high probability that these three methods will give three different answers, and, in fact, Brunt and Fidalgo (2018) showed in their paper that "these three approaches do give three different answers when estimating output levels and growth rates in the US and UK – and they are not only different to one another, but also different to a comparison using the (more theoretically justifiable) chained GK prices." Even though it is more theoretically justifiable, it does not mean it should be used without considering every aspect of this method.

For example, Maddison (2001) used the 1990 international dollar when he examined prices during the time of Christ. Ideally, we would use a price benchmark which is significantly closer to the time of Christ. However, there are no such benchmarks. Another problem is that there is no set of international prices, which we could use for valid cross-country comparisons. Comparing GDP levels across countries using their own prices converted at the nominal exchange rate has no value whatsoever. This approach is quite arbitrary because the exchange rate is determined simply by the supply and demand for currency and these metrics are greatly dependent on the volumes of trade balances. It makes little (or no) sense to value all goods (both traded and non-traded at the nominal exchange rate, especially since the absolute volumes of trades may be small compared to total output in both countries.

Economists therefore create PPP exchange rates, deriving the exchange rate by valuing a basket of goods in the two countries at two sets of prices (and expressing them as a ratio afterwards). This allows us to see how much it actually costs to live in said country. Although with this approach emerges another problem. What should we choose to be in the basket? Brunt and Fidalgo (2018) use examples of an English basket in 1775 and Chinese basket in 1775. While the English one would have a lot of wheat, the Chinese one would have a lot of rice. Wheat was quite affordable in England and rice was quite affordable in China, however, if we switch these goods, they both would be relatively expensive. This nicely illustrates how choice of the content of the basket will influence the comparison. Simply by using English basket, China would seem like an expensive place to live and vice versa.

Geary-Khamis tries to solve this by estimating a weighted average price of each commodity using the shares of countries in world production to weight the country prices. Another problem emerges when researchers compare countries which have different price structure than the international price structure. Brunt and Fidalgo (2018) show examples of Ireland (which has really similar price structure to the international) and South Africa (which has really different price structure to the international). So, when using domestic and international price indices, Ireland's growth rates move in very similar direction, but when domestic and international prices are applied to South Africa, they, in fact, move in opposite directions. It is worth noting, that bigger countries tend to have a price index that moves more similarly to the international price index. It is simply because bigger countries have a bigger weight in creation of this index.

See also 

 World currency
 World currency unit
 Special drawing rights

References

External links 
 Handbook of the International Comparison Programme. Annex II – Methods of Aggregation. Statistical definition at the UN United Nations Statistics Division. 2007
 IMF – Implied PPP conversion rate/National currency per international dollar
 FAO Geary-Khamis statistical yearbook http://www.fao.org/fileadmin/templates/ess/documents/publications_studies/statistical_yearbook/gearyKhamis.pdf
 Brunt, L., Fidalgo, A., (2018) Why 1990 international Geary-Khamis dollars cannot be a foundation for reliable long run comparisons of GDP
 Deaton, A., Heston, A., (2009) Understanding PPPs and PPP-based national accounts https://www.princeton.edu/~deaton/downloads/deaton_heston_complete_nov10.pdf
 Schmidt, M., International Dollar, Geary-Khamis Dollar https://www.business-case-analysis.com/international-dollar.html
 Cuthbert, J., R., Cuthbert, M., (1988) On aggregation methods of purchasing power parities, OECD https://www.oecd.org/economy/outlook/2002058.pdf

Purchasing power
Currencies introduced in 1958